Hakea cyclocarpa, commonly known as the ram's horn, wild bean or curved-fruit hakea  is a shrub in the family Proteaceae. A strongly scented species with large creamy-white flowers with a red style and interesting fruit. Native to an area along the west coast and south west regions of Western Australia.

Description
Smaller branches and new leaves are covered with soft matted white or rusty coloured hairs. It blooms from August to October. Leaves are narrowly egg-shaped widest in the middle,  either rounded or a blunt point at the apex.

Taxonomy and naming
Hakea cyclocarpa was collected by James Drummond in 1839.  The species was first formally described by English botanist John Lindley in 1840 and  published in A Sketch of the Vegetation of the Swan River Colony. The specific epithet (cyclocarpa) is derived  from the Ancient Greek  words kyklos meaning "circle", and karpos for  "fruit",  referring to the almost circular form of the fruit.

Distribution and habitat
Hakea cyclocarpa grows from the Darling Range near Perth and south to the jarrah forests to Augusta. An uncommon species growing on granite, laterite, loam, clay, sand and gravelly soils in heath and forests.  An ornamental shrub that is drought and frost tolerant, requiring semi-shade and a well-drained site.

Conservation status
Presently considered "not threatened" by the Western Australian Government, Department of Parks and Wildlife.

References

cyclocarpa
Eudicots of Western Australia
Plants described in 1840
Taxa named by John Lindley